Magdalena Czyszczoń (born 4 March 1995) is a Polish speed skater. She competed in the women's 16 lap mass start event during the 2018 Winter Olympics.

References 

1995 births
Living people
Polish female speed skaters
Speed skaters at the 2018 Winter Olympics
Speed skaters at the 2022 Winter Olympics
Olympic speed skaters of Poland
Sportspeople from Zakopane